Victorious 3.0: Even More Music from the Hit TV Show is the third soundtrack and the second extended play for the Victorious series. The album was released November 6, 2012, with a total of 5 tracks. Daniella Monet also announced that there would be a "Walmart Exclusive ZinePak" with two bonus tracks and the bonus tracks are: "Cheer Me Up" by Victoria Justice, which was partly performed in the season 3 episode, "Tori Goes Platinum"; and "365 Days" by Leon Thomas III, which was also partly performed in the season 2 episode, "Jade Gets Crushed". On the album, Thomas is just by himself and is not singing with Justice like in the episode.

Promotion

Promotional single 
"L.A. Boyz" is performed by Victoria Justice and Ariana Grande. It was released with the pre-order of the album on October 16, 2012. It is featured on the season 4 episode "Three Girls and a Moose", which aired on October 20, 2012, the music video followed the episode. This is the only song on the soundtrack and episode sung by two people.

Other songs 
"Here's 2 Us" is performed by Victoria Justice. It is featured on the season 4 episode, "One Thousand Berry Balls" which premiered on Saturday, December 8, 2012. The music video for it released on November 24, 2012. In the episode, Tori performs the song with Andre, but on the soundtrack, it is just Tori. 

"Faster Than Boyz" is performed by Victoria Justice. It is featured on the season 4 episode, "The Bad Roommate" which premiered on January 5, 2013. The music video for it released on the same date of the episode. In the episode, Justice performs the song with Leon Thomas III, ⁣⁣ but on the soundtrack, it is Justice alone.

"You Don't Know Me" was sung by Elizabeth Gillies on the season 4 episode, "Tori Fixes Beck and Jade". This is Gillies' only solo in the series.

"Bad Boys" was sung by Justice in the season 4 episode, "Star Spangled Tori". "Bad Boys" was the last song ever performed on Victorious. After the episode aired, the song became more popular, similar to, "You Don't Know Me", downloads of the song increased on iTunes. This is the only song on the soundtrack that is sung by Justice alone on both the episode and soundtrack.

Track listing

Charts

Release history

References 

2012 EPs
2012 soundtrack albums
Columbia Records EPs
Columbia Records soundtracks
Television soundtracks
Victoria Justice albums
Victorious